American handball, known as handball in the United States and sometimes referred to as wallball, is a sport in which players use their hands to hit a small, rubber ball against a wall such that their opponent(s) cannot do the same without the ball touching the ground twice or hitting out-of-bound. The three versions are four-wall, three-wall and one-wall (also known as Wallball or international fronton). Each version can be played either by two players (singles), three players (cutthroat) or four players (doubles), but in official tournaments, singles and doubles are the only versions played.

History

Games in which a ball is hit or thrown have been referenced as far back as Homer and ancient Egypt. A game similar to handball was played by Northern and Central Americans from 1500 BC, most famously by the Aztecs as the Mesoamerican ballgame. However, no references to a rebound game using a wall survive. It is thought that these ancient games more closely resembled a form of hand tennis. Further examples of similar games include the European-originated games of Basque pelota (or Jai-alai), Valencian frontó, International fronton and Welsh handball.

The first recorded game of striking a ball against a wall using a hand was in Scotland in 1427, when King James I ordered a cellar window in his palace courtyard to be blocked up, as it was interfering with his game. In Ireland, the earliest written record of a similar game is in the 1527 town statutes of Galway, which forbade the playing of ball games against the walls of the town. The first depiction of an Irish form of handball does not appear until 1785. The sport of handball in Ireland was eventually standardized as Gaelic handball. By the mid-19th century, Australians were playing a similar game, which developed into the modern sport of Australian handball.

American
In Treacherous Beauty, by Mark Jacob and Stephen H. Case, about the Arnold-Andre conspiracy, Major John Andre and General Sir Henry Clinton are said to have played a game called handball during the American Revolution. The earliest record of the modern game in the United States mentions two handball courts in San Francisco in 1873. The sport grew over the next few decades. By the early 1900s, four-wall handball was well established and a one-wall game was developed in New York City by beach-goers who hit bald tennis balls with their hands against the sides of the wooden jetties that lined beaches. This led to a rise in one-wall handball at New York beaches and by the 1930s, thousands of indoor and outdoor one-wall courts had been built throughout the city. American handball is seen predominantly in parks, beaches, and high school yards in New York, Chicago and other large urban areas.

National Championships 
National championships in handball have been held annually in the United States since 1919. These championships were organized by the Amateur Athletic Union (AAU) until 1950, when their control was transferred to the newly formed United States Handball Association (USHA).

Influence on racquetball and wall paddleball
The sports of racquetball, squash, fives, four-wall and one-wall paddleball were heavily influenced by handball. Four-wall paddleball and one-wall paddleball were created when people took up wooden paddles to play on handball courts. Four-wall paddleball was invented in 1930 by Earl Riskey, a physical-education instructor at the University of Michigan, when he came up with the idea of using paddles to play on the school's handball courts. Racquetball was invented in 1949 by Joe Sobek in Greenwich, Connecticut, when he played handball using a strung racquet.

Court 

American handball is played on a walled court, with either a single (front) wall, three walls, or in a fully enclosed four-wall court; four-wall courts typically have a ceiling while three-wall courts may or may not. The four-wall court is a rectangular box.

In the middle of the floor lies a short line, dividing the floor into two  squares. The service zone is the area between these two lines. Some courts have a glass back wall and glass side walls to allow for better viewing. (In three-wall court handball, the court often has a front wall and two full side walls, or the front wall is flanked by two triangular wings.)

Play 
Handball may be played as singles (two players against each other), doubles (two teams of two players), or "cutthroat" (three players rotating one against two). In cutthroat handball, one server plays against two receivers, until he or she is "put out" (Other terms include "down" or "side out"). Then, the left-most receiver serves. Serves rotate in this way until one player wins by scoring either 7, 11, 15, or 21 points. Should both teams reach a score 1 below the winning score, the game can be continued by "win-by-two" or "straight". In "win-by-two", the winning score is increased by 2 points. In 'straight', the score remains the same and cannot be pushed. When a tie of 20 is reached in a 21-point match, a common decision is 'straight 25', where the winning score is set to 25 and cannot be changed. The cutthroat mode of play is also known as "triangles."

Service (4-Wall) 
The ball is served by one player standing in the service zone. The server begins by dropping the ball to the floor of the service zone and striking it, after one bounce, with the hand or fist so that it hits the front wall. The ball must hit the front wall first; it may then hit at most one side wall before the first bounce; the served ball must then bounce on the floor past the short line but before reaching the back wall.

If the served ball lands in front of the short line, it is called a "short," while a serve that reaches the back wall without bouncing is called "long," and a serve that hits both side walls before hitting the floor is called a "3-wall." These are all types of errors known as service faults. After one service fault, the server will have only one serve remaining. The server is "put out" by hitting two faults in a row and becomes the receiver. However, if any serve hits the ceiling, floor, or a side wall before hitting the front wall, the server is out (no second serve allowed).

In doubles, the server's teammate has to stand in the service area with their back to a side wall in a service box, marked by a parallel line  from the side wall, until the ball passes the short line.

Return (4-Wall) 
While the server has the ball, the receiver must stand at least  behind the short line, indicated by dashed lines extending  from each side wall. Once the ball is served, the receiver must hit the ball either directly ("on the fly") or after the first bounce. However, a receiver choosing to take the serve on the fly must first wait for the ball to cross the short line (the dashed line, in racquetball).

The ball can bounce off the floor twice. Also, any player during a return may hit the ball off the floor before it touches the front wall. The server then hits the ball on the rebound from the front wall, and play continues with the opponents alternately hitting the ball until one of them fails to make a legal return. After the serve and return, the ball may be played from anywhere and may hit any number of walls, the ceiling, or a player so long as it hits the front wall before bouncing on the floor. Players can "hinder" (block) their opponents from hitting the ball. Servers failing to make a legal return is "put out" and becomes the receiver. If the receiver fails to make the return, a point goes to the server, who continues to serve until "put out." Only the server/serving team can score points. The game goes to the player/team first to score 21 points. A match goes to the player/team to win two out of three games; the third game goes to 11 points.

Variants

Three-wall
A three-wall handball court is an outside court with a front-wall, two side-walls (these may be "full" or "half"—half being a pair of sloping side-walls), and no back-wall in the play area. It is played very much like an indoor four-wall court, only with the challenge of returning the ball without any back-wall rebound. The long line at the forty-foot mark is considered out if the ball hits it when hitting the floor.

One-wall / Wallball / International fronton

When not played as part of tournament or league play, the one-wall game typically uses the bigger ball called "the big blue" (described below in the "Equipment" section). The main difference between one-wall handball and other versions is that the ball must always be played off the front wall. One-wall handball can be watched by more people than a four-wall game. The court is also cheaper to build, making this version of handball popular at gymnasiums and playgrounds. In New York City alone, an estimated 2,299 public handball courts occupy the five boroughs.

Equipment

A typical outfit includes protective gloves, sneakers, athletic shorts and goggles. Eye protection is required in tournament handball, as the ball moves at high speeds and in close proximity to the players. It is rarely used in "street" handball, however, where a softer "big blue" ball is usually used.

Small ball versus big ball

A true handball is referred to as an "ace ball" or, in earlier days, "blackball". A racquetball used to play handball is called a "big ball" or "big blue". A small ball is hard, bounces higher and moves faster. Types of small balls include the Red Ace (for men) and the White Ace (for women). The Red Ace small ball is heavier than the White Ace small ball.

A big ball bounces slower and is softer and hollower than a small ball.

Four-wall games use the small ball almost exclusively. Three-wall and one-wall games use both balls. Both balls are used extensively in New York City, with formal tournaments for big ball – NYC Big Blue, for example. Internationally, the big ball is used most often in the One-wall game (in the European 1-Wall Tour, the big ball is used exclusively for the Tour), however at World Handball Championships organised by the World Handball Council, competitions in both big-ball and small ball are offered for the One-wall code.

Terms and techniques

Variations
 School handball is an extended version of handball played at schools across the nation. It has three modes of play: freestyle, old school, and new school.
 Handball is played in Loyola School, Jamshedpur, India. It was introduced in the school as early as 1949 by Father Keogh.
 Wall ball is a generic name for a variety of similar street games played by children, often with tennis balls.
 Prison handball is a simplified version of handball popular in North American prisons.
 Frisian handball, is a Dutch version known as Kaatsen.
 Picigin is a Croatian game played since 1908 in Split on Bachvitse (Bačvice) beach in shallow water with attractive dives to keep the ball in the air.
 Chinese handball is another variation of handball (albeit developed in America) where the return must hit the ground before the wall. There are no teams in this variation.

Notable players
Naty Alvarado
Albert Apuzzi
Paul Brady
David Chapman
Paul Haber
Vic Hershkowitz
Jimmy Jacobs
Fred Lewis
Oscar Obert
Joe Platak
Robert Ripley
Simon Singer (born 1941), American world champion player
John "Rookie" Wright

See also

 Handball
 Wallball
Baseball5, a variation of baseball in which the batters hit using their bare hands

References

External links

United States Handball Association
World Handball Council
World Players of Handball

Handball sports
Wall and ball games
Indoor sports
Sports rules and regulations
Sports originating in the United States